At the end of 2016, the installed capacity for wind power in Minnesota was 3,500 megawatts (MW). Wind power generated nearly 18 percent of Minnesota’s electricity in 2016, ranking sixth in the nation
for wind energy as a share of total electricity generation.

Large wind farms in Minnesota include the Buffalo Ridge Wind Farm (225 MW), the Fenton Wind Farm (205.5 MW), the Nobles Wind Farm (201 MW), the Odell Wind Farm (200 MW) and the Bent Tree Wind Farm (201 MW).

Transmission Grid Improvements 

The CapX2020 project (capacity expansion 2020) is developing the transmission grid infrastructure to improve capacity, reliability, and support further wind power development.  The project is mostly in Minnesota but reaches into North Dakota, South Dakota, and Wisconsin as well. One phase of the project, a line from Monticello to St. Cloud was completed in 2011. Other lines will run from near Brookings, South Dakota to Hampton, Minnesota, from Fargo, North Dakota to St. Cloud, and from La Crosse, Wisconsin to Hampton. The project involves constructing about 590 miles of 345 kV transmission line and 68 miles of 238 kV transmission line. CapX2020 is expected to be completed around 2015. in

Minnesota has a renewable portfolio standard requiring 25% of electricity come from renewable sources by 2025.

Statistics

Source:

See also
Solar power in Minnesota
Wind power in the United States
Renewable energy in the United States

References

External links

 Minnesota Department of Commerce
 AWEA State Wind Fact Sheets